USS Raven and USS Raven III have been the names of more than one United States Navy ship, and may refer to:

 , a schooner in commission from 1813 to 1815
 , a patrol boat, renamed USS SP-103 soon after commissioning, in commission from 1917 to 1919
 USS Raven (AM-49), a planned  from Baltimore Dry Dock and Shipbuilding Company; construction canceled 4 December 1918
 , a minesweeper in commission from 1940 to 1946, lead unit of the Raven class
 , a coastal minehunter commissioned in 1998 and stricken in 2007

See also
 

United States Navy ship names